The Sofitel Legend Old Cataract Aswan Hotel, commonly known as the Old Cataract Hotel, is a historic British colonial-era 5-star luxury resort hotel located on the banks of the River Nile in Aswan, Egypt. It was built in 1899 by Thomas Cook and opened under the name Cataract Hotel. In 1961 the hotel was expanded with the addition of a new tower wing, operating as the budget wing of the hotel.  From 2008 to 2011 the hotel was closed and underwent a complete restoration, reopening in October 2011 as the Sofitel Legend Old Cataract Aswan Hotel.

History
The Cataract Hotel was built in 1899 by Thomas Cook to house European travelers to Assouan (as Aswan was then known). Its guests have included Tsar Nicholas II, Winston Churchill, Howard Carter, Margaret Thatcher, Jimmy Carter, François Mitterrand, Princess Diana, Queen Noor and Agatha Christie, who set portions of her novel Death on the Nile at the hotel. The 1978 film of the novel was shot at the hotel. The Dining Room was added in 1902. The architect was H. Favarger.

A new modern tower wing was built in 1961. It was known as the New Cataract Hotel and operated as a budget wing of the hotel for many years, while the original wing was eventually renamed the Old Cataract Hotel. In 1973 United States Secretary of State Dr Henry Kissinger and his aides stayed in the New Cataract Hotel during the negotiations to end the Yom Kippur War. In the 1990s, the French Accor hotel company assumed management of the Old Cataract and the New Cataract, placing them first in their Pullman Hotels division, and then in their Sofitel division.

Both wings of the hotel were closed from 2008 to 2011 for a complete restoration, during which the 1961 New Cataract tower was combined with the historic Old Cataract wing into one hotel. The Old Cataract wing, which previously had 131 rooms and eight suites, was renamed the Palace Wing, and rebuilt to house 76 rooms and 45 suites. The New Cataract wing, which previously had 144 rooms, was renamed the Nile Wing, rebuilt with 62 rooms including 37 suites, all with a balcony with a river view. The hotel reopened on October 18, 2011, as the Sofitel Legend Old Cataract Aswan Hotel.

Egypt's CBC used the Old Cataract as the primary filming location for its musalsal adaptation of the popular Spanish series Gran Hotel in 2016.

Gallery

See also

References

External links

Sofitel Legend Old Cataract Aswan

Hotel buildings completed in 1899
Hotels established in 1899
Hotels in Egypt
Sofitel
Hotel buildings completed in 1961
Aswan
1899 establishments in Egypt
19th-century architecture in Egypt